Liberty Forever! is a World War I song, performed by The Victor Military Band. It was released in 1918 under the label Victor. In July 1918, it reached the number six spot on the US song charts.

References

External links
Liberty Forever played by the Victor Military Band

Songs about freedom
1918 songs
Songs of World War I